Veroli is a town and comune in the province of Frosinone, Lazio, central Italy, in the Latin Valley.

History
Veroli (Verulae) became a Roman municipium in 90 BC.  It became the seat of a bishopric in 743 AD, and was occupied by Spanish soldiers, allied to the Colonna family, in the 16th century.

Main sights
Veroli retains elements of its ancient polygonal nucleus, especially near the summit of the hill, later occupied by a medieval castle.  The Cathedral's treasury contains the breviary of St. Louis of Toulouse, and some interesting reliquaries, one in ivory with bas-reliefs, and two in the Gothic style, of silver gilt. Near Veroli is the  Gothic Abbey of Casamari. In Via Garibaldi is located Sant'Erasmo, a Romanesque architecture, Roman Catholic church and convent.

Bounding communes

Alatri
Balsorano
Boville Ernica
Collepardo
Frosinone
Monte San Giovanni Campano
Morino
Ripi
San Vincenzo Valle Roveto
Sora
Torrice

Frazioni
Frazioni of Veroli include:
Castelmassimo, Colleberardi, Colle Ciaffone, Cotropagno, Giglio di Veroli, Madonna della Vittoria, San Giuseppe le Prata, Santa Francesca, Sant'Angelo in villa, Scifelli, Aia le monache, Bagnara, Casamari, Case Cibba, Case Cocchi, Case Fiorini, Case Gattone, Case Palmerini-Oste, Case Pinciveri, Case Ricci, Case Scaccia, Case Sciascia, Case Volpi, Casino Spani, Castello, Chiarano, Colle Capito, Colle grosso, Colle Martino, Cona dei greci, Crescenzi, Crocifisso, Fontana Fratta, Gaude, Madonna degli Angeli, Madonna del pianto, Madonna di Foiano, Ponte Vasagalli, Puppari, San Cristoforo, San Filippo, Santa Maria Amaseno, Sant'Anna, San Vito, Speluca, Stere Mancini, Tondarella, Tor dei venti, Torre Caravicchia, Tretticatore, Vado Amaseno, Valle Amaseno, Vernieri, Virano.

People
 Maria Fortunata Viti
 Aonio Paleario

Twin towns
 Bruck an der Mur, Austria
 Spinea, Italy
 Issoire, French

References

Sources

External links
Official website 
Images of Veroli

90 BC
90s BC establishments